The third season of The Real Housewives of Atlanta, an American reality television series, was broadcast on Bravo. It aired from October 4, 2010, until February 20, 2011, and was primarily filmed in Atlanta, Georgia. Its executive producers are Lauren Eskelin, Lorraine Haughton, Glenda Hersh, Carlos King, Steven Weinstock and Andy Cohen.

The Real Housewives of Atlanta focuses on the lives of NeNe Leakes, Shereé Whitfield, Kim Zolciak, Kandi Burruss, Cynthia Bailey and Phaedra Parks. It consisted of eighteen episodes.

Production and crew
Season 3 of The Real Housewives of Atlanta was revealed along with the cast and a trailer in August, 2010. The season premiere episode "New Attitude" was broadcast on October 4, 2010, while the sixteenth episode "The Bride and the Doom" served as the season finale, and was aired on January 30, 2011. It was followed by a two-part reunion  that aired on  February 13, and February 20, 2011, which marked the conclusion of the season. Lauren Eskelin, Lorraine Haughton, Glenda Hersh, Carlos King, and Steven Weinstock are recognized as the series' executive producers; it is produced and distributed by True Entertainment, an American subsidiary of the Italian corporation Endemol.

Cast and synopsis
Season 3 saw the departure of Lisa Wu, who returned in a guest appearance, and introduced 2 new wives, Cynthia Bailey and Phaedra Parks. The season depicted Leakes and Zolciak reconcile, as the former contemplated divorcing her husband Gregg and then Kim Z began a lesbian relationship. Parks, who was in the middle of her pregnancy, clashed with her husband Apollo Nida over their differing opinions on parenting; she gave birth later in the season. Meanwhile, Zolciak and Burruss continued recording music together, although they clashed over their creative differences. Bailey later became engaged to her boyfriend Peter Thomas, while Zolciak set her affections on football player Kroy Biermann; a conflict between Burruss, Leakes, and Zolciak later ensued while the latter two women embark on a promotional concert tour. Against the advice of her mother and sister, Bailey married Thomas in the third-season finale.

Episodes

References

External links

2010 American television seasons
2011 American television seasons
Atlanta (season 3)